Arbutus menziesii or Pacific madrone (commonly madrone or madrona in the United States and arbutus in Canada), is a species of broadleaf evergreen tree in the family Ericaceae, native to the western coastal areas of North America, from British Columbia to California.
It is nicknamed the "Refrigerator Tree" due to the fact that its bark contains water, and it stays cool in the summer

Its waxy evergreen foliage, contorted growth habit, and distinctive flaky bark make it a striking sight in the coastal cliffs and hills where it is abundant.

Description
The thin bark is a rich orange-red, and when mature naturally peels away in thin sheets, leaving a greenish, silvery appearance that has a smooth satin sheen. Older trunks are gray-brown near the base. The leaves are evergreen, lasting a few years before detaching. Some second-year leaves turn orange to red and detach in the autumn. In the north of its range, wet winters often promote a brown to black leaf discoloration due to fungal infections; the stain lasts until the leaves naturally detach at the end of their lifespan. In spring, the tree bears sprays of small white to pink bell-like flowers, and in autumn, red berries. The berries dry up and have hooked barbs that latch onto larger animals for migration.

Individual specimens can live for over 300 years.

Common names 
In Canada, it is simply referred to as arbutus. It is known in the United States as the madrona, madrone, madroño, madroña, or bearberry. The name strawberry tree (A. unedo) may also be found in relation to A. menziesii (though it has no relation to the strawberry fruit).  According to the Sunset Western Garden Book, in the United States, the name "madrone" is more common south of the Siskiyou Mountains of southern Oregon and Northern California and the name "madrona" is more common north of the Siskiyous. The Concow tribe calls the tree dis-tā'-tsi (Konkow language) or kou-wät′-chu. Its species name was given it in honor of the Scottish naturalist Archibald Menzies, who noted it during George Vancouver's voyage of exploration.

Distribution and habitat 
Madrones are native to the western coast of North America, from British Columbia (chiefly Vancouver Island and the Gulf Islands) to California. They are mainly found in Puget Sound, the Oregon Coast Range, and California Coast Ranges, but are also scattered on the west slope of the Sierra Nevada and Cascade mountain ranges. They are rare south of Santa Barbara County, with isolated stands south to Palomar Mountain in California. One author lists their southern range as extending as far as Baja California in Mexico, but others point out that there are no recorded specimens collected that far south, and the trees are absent from modern surveys of native trees there. However, other Arbutus species are endemic to the area.

It fares well in dry and rocky sites, is tolerant of salt water, but fairly intolerant of shade.

Ecology

The tree can be found growing along with Douglas-fir. The thin bark is susceptible to fire, but new saplings readily sprout after such disturbances. Mature trees survive fire, and can regenerate more rapidly after fire than Douglas-firs. Pacific madrone also produce very large numbers of seeds, which sprout following fire. The tree also sprouts from cut stems.

Many mammal and bird species feed off the berries, including juncos, American robins, cedar waxwings, band-tailed pigeons, varied thrushes, quail, mule deer, raccoons, ring-tailed cats, and bears. As the fruit are produced in great quantity and may persist on the tree into winter, their value as a food source is great. Mule deer will also eat the young shoots when the trees are regenerating after fire. The flowers also produce nectar which can be made into honey. Mature leaves are almost always ignored by browsing animals, but young leafy sprouts are eaten by ungulates and the dusky-footed woodrat. It is considered a high-importance winter forage species for many ungulates.

It is important as a nest site for many birds, and in mixed woodland it seems to be chosen for nestbuilding disproportionately to its numbers. This may be due to the susceptibility of the tree to heart rot, which makes it desirable for cavity-nesting birds. Pacific Madrona also provides cover for big game and small mammals, and perching sites for a variety of bird species. They are important habitat for woodpecker and sapsucker species.

Pathogens 
Arbutus menziesii has low disease resistance and hosts many pathogens such as heart rot, butt rot, and stem cankers. It is afflicted by a fungal leaf blister disease caused by Exobasidium vaccinii which causes mostly aesthetic damage. The species is also lethally affected by fungi of the genus Phytophthora, including the sudden oak death (Phytophthora ramorum) which damages branches and foliage, and a canker disease caused by Phytophthora cactorum which leads to root and butt rot.  Other pathogens include Arbutus canker (Nattrassia mangiferae), which causes shoot blight; Fusicoccum aesculi which causes dieback and creates a burned appearance; and  Neofusicoccum arbuti, madrone canker, which cause dead or dying branches, crown dieback, cankers, and sometimes death.
Thinning stands, soil loss and compaction, and a host of other impacts increase susceptibility to disease, especially on less dense stands.

Conservation 
Although drought tolerant and relatively fast growing, Arbutus menziesii is currently declining throughout most of its range. One likely cause is fire control; under natural conditions, the madrona depends on intermittent naturally occurring fires to reduce the conifer overstory.

Increasing development pressures in its native habitat have also contributed to a decline in the number of mature specimens. This tree is extremely sensitive to alteration of the grade or drainage near the root crown.  Until about 1970, this phenomenon was not widely recognized on the west coast; thereafter, many local governments have addressed this issue by stringent restrictions on grading and drainage alterations when Arbutus menziesii trees are present.

Invasive species such as Scotch broom and gorse are a threat to the Pacific madrona as they can invade natural areas and outcompete young saplings for space, light, nutrients, and water.

Largest specimen burned 
During the Soberanes Fire in the summer of 2016, the largest known specimen of madrone was burned and possibly killed. The tree was located within the Joshua Creek Canyon Ecological Reserve on the Big Sur Coast of California. The fire was caused by an illegal campfire.

Cultivation 

The trees are difficult to transplant and a seedling should be set in its permanent spot while still small. The site should be sunny (south- or west-facing slopes are best), well drained, and lime-free (although occasionally a seedling will establish itself on a shell midden). In its native range, a tree needs no extra water or food once it has become established. Water and nitrogen fertilizer will boost its growth, but at the cost of making it more susceptible to disease.

This plant has gained the Royal Horticultural Society's Award of Garden Merit.

Uses 
Native Americans ate the berries raw and cooked, but because the berries have a high tannin content and are thus astringent, they more often chewed them or made them into a cider. Overeating causes cramps. Native Americans also use the berries to make necklaces and other decorations, and as bait for fishing (as did the Karuk people to catch steelhead). Bark and leaves were used to treat stomach aches, cramps, skin ailments, and sore throats. The bark was often made into a tea to be drunk for these medicinal purposes.

Early Californian settlers may have used charcoal from the species to make gunpowder.

The wood is durable and has a warm color after finishing, so it has become more popular as a flooring material, especially in the Pacific Northwest.  An attractive veneer can also be made from the wood.  However, because large pieces of madrona lumber warp severely and unpredictably during the drying process, they are not used much. Madrone is burned for firewood, though, since it is a very hard and dense wood that burns long and hot, surpassing even oak in this regard. The Saanich people of British Columbia have a prohibition against burning arbutus due to its salvific role in their creation myths.

References

Works cited

External links

Jepson Flora Project: Arbutus menziesii
The BC Ministry of Forests and Range Tree Book on Arbutus

menziesii
Flora of the West Coast of the United States
Flora of British Columbia
Natural history of the California chaparral and woodlands
Natural history of the California Coast Ranges
Natural history of the Peninsular Ranges
Natural history of the San Francisco Bay Area
Natural history of the Santa Monica Mountains
Natural history of the Transverse Ranges
Plants described in 1813
Trees of North America
Trees of the West Coast of the United States
Trees of the Western United States
Trees of the United States
Trees of Western Canada
Trees of Canada
Trees of the Northwestern United States